Wolsingham School  is a coeducational secondary school located in Wolsingham, County Durham, England.

The school is situated just off the A689, and near the River Wear in the former district of Wear Valley. This is the former grammar school. In the past the lower site was the site for Key Stage 3, while the upper site was for Key Stage 4. This system no longer exists.

History
Wolsingham had two school buildings – 'Wolsingham Grammar School' on Main Road which then became Wolsingham Secondary School, with the addition of a new building opened in 1958 on the site of the school playing fields. This coincided with the abandonment of the 11+ selection process, but the school retained streaming based on ability. The original school was founded in 1614, with new grammar school buildings opening in 1911. The 1958 building has since been demolished and the old building substantially extended to accommodate all pupils.

In June 1964 12-year-old pupil Sanchia Hayes was killed when her school bus hit a lorry in Frosterley.

The school opened its new £6.4 million building in 2016 and was officially opened by the Duke of Gloucester.

Previously a community school administered by Durham County Council, in September 2020 Wolsingham School converted to academy status. The school is now sponsored by the Advance Learning Partnership.

Notable Former Pupils
 Ernest Armstrong, Labour MP from 1964 to 1987 of North West Durham
 Luke Armstrong, professional footballer who has played for several clubs including Middlesbrough, Salford City and Hartlepool United
 Harry Beevers (1924-2004), plant physiologist. His siblings attended the school including Leonard Beevers, also a plant physiologist.
 Prof William Laurence Burn, historian, Professor of Modern History from 1944 to 1966 at Newcastle University
 Air Vice-Marshal Robert Davis CB, Station Commander from 1975 to 1977 of RAF Leuchars and Commander from 1980 to 1983 of British Forces Cyprus
 Prof Brian Foster (physicist) OBE, FRS, HonFInstP, Donald H. Perkins Professor of Experimental Physics from 2003 to 2022 at the University of Oxford, holder of an Alexander von Humboldt Professorship at the University of Hamburg from 2011 to 2019 and Professor of Experimental Physics at the University of Bristol from 1996 to 2003
 Rev Roger Hall MBE QHC, Chaplain to the Chapel Royal of St Peter ad Vincula since 2007
 John James CB OBE, town planner, Professor of Town and Regional Planning from 1967 to 1977 at the University of Sheffield
 Flight Sergeant Thomas Jaye (from Crook, County Durham, 3 October 1922 - 17 May 1943) flew as a navigator with Lancaster AJ-S in the third wave of the Dambusters Raid, and died aged 21, when the aircraft was hit by flak flying to the target over Holland; all the crew died when the aircraft crashed at Gilze-Rijen Air Base at 01.53, piloted by Canadian Pilot Officer Lewis Burpee; he is buried in Bergen op Zoom War Cemetery; there is a memorial at the school, dedicated on 11 November 1998
 Fred Peart, Baron Peart, Labour MP from 1945 to 1976 for Workington, Minister of Agriculture, Fisheries and Food from 1964 to 1968 and 1974–76
 Brian Peart, Chief Administrator from 1976 to 1980 of ADAS
 Sir Harold Shearman, Labour politician, chairman from 1964 to 1966 of the Greater London Council, and President from 1962 to 1971 of the School Journey Association, and member of the Robbins Committee.

News items
 Taking over the local pool in May 2009

References

External links
 Former grammar school

Secondary schools in County Durham
Academies in County Durham
Educational institutions established in the 1610s
1614 establishments in England
Wolsingham